Rudolf Hager (born 28 April 1941) is a German former sports shooter. He competed in the trap event at the 1968 Summer Olympics for East Germany.

References

1941 births
Living people
German male sport shooters
Olympic shooters of East Germany
Shooters at the 1968 Summer Olympics